Shaun Patrick Livingston (born September 11, 1985) is an American professional basketball executive and former player. Livingston entered the league directly out of high school and was selected fourth by the Los Angeles Clippers in the 2004 NBA draft. In a 15 year professional career in the league, Livingston played 959 games for nine teams and won three NBA championships as a Golden State Warrior—in 2015, 2017 and 2018. In 2007, Livingston suffered a debilitating knee injury that damaged almost every part of his left knee. It took him about a year and a half to return. Between 2008 and 2010 he played only 22 league games. Livingston has played for the Miami Heat, Oklahoma City Thunder, Washington Wizards, Charlotte Bobcats, Milwaukee Bucks, Cleveland Cavaliers, Brooklyn Nets, and Tulsa 66ers. He played his last five seasons in the league with the Warriors and retired from professional basketball in September 2019.

Early years
Livingston was born in Peoria, Illinois. He led Concordia Lutheran Grade School to LSA state titles in 1999 and 2000. Livingston played competitive basketball in high school at Richwoods High School for two years and then transferred to Peoria Central High School, where he led his team to back-to-back Class AA state titles in 2003 and 2004. 

In 2004, he was named Illinois Mr. Basketball and played in the McDonald's All-American Game. In 2007, Livingston was voted one of the 100 Legends of the IHSA Boys Basketball Tournament for his superior performance in the tournament. Considered a five-star recruit by Rivals.com, Livingston was listed as the No. 1 point guard and the No. 2 player in the nation in 2004. He committed to play college hoops at Duke, but opted instead to make the jump to the NBA straight out of high school.

Professional career

Los Angeles Clippers (2004–2008)
Livingston committed to Duke, but opted to skip college and enter the 2004 NBA Draft where he was selected fourth by the Los Angeles Clippers. Livingston recorded a career-high 14 assists on February 23, 2007, against the Golden State Warriors.

In his first two NBA seasons, he played 91 games and averaged 6.3 points per game. In his third season, he averaged a career-high 9.3 points per game, being one of the few Clippers to improve from the 2005–06 season. In a game against the Charlotte Bobcats on February 26, 2007, Livingston suffered a debilitating knee injury, dislocating his left kneecap after landing awkwardly following a missed layup, resulting in the left leg snapping laterally. Livingston injured almost every part of his knee, tearing the anterior cruciate ligament (ACL), the posterior cruciate ligament (PCL), and the lateral meniscus, badly spraining his medial collateral ligament (MCL), and dislocating his patella and his tibio-fibular joint. Livingston was told by a medical professional at the hospital that there was a chance that his leg would have to be amputated. He required months of rehabilitation to be able to walk again. Livingston was also riddled by injuries during the first three years of his professional career, and missed 101 of 246 regular season games.

Miami Heat (2008–2009)
Livingston's contract with the Clippers expired after the 2007–08 season, and the Clippers did not make Livingston a $5.8 million qualifying offer, making him an unrestricted free agent. On June 16, 2008, doctors allowed Livingston to resume basketball activities; during the 2008 offseason, he tried to find a guaranteed contract to finalize his comeback. The Minnesota Timberwolves and Portland Trail Blazers were interested, but it was reported he eventually signed a two-year deal with the Miami Heat on October 3, 2008. In 4 games with the Heat, he averaged 2.3 points and 10.3 minutes.

Tulsa 66ers (2009) 
On January 7, 2009, Livingston was traded to the Memphis Grizzlies along with cash considerations for a conditional 2012 second-round pick. He was then waived later that same day. On March 7, 2009, Livingston signed with the Tulsa 66ers, the NBA development league team owned by the Oklahoma City Thunder.

Oklahoma City Thunder (2009) 
After three weeks with the 66ers, Livingston signed a multi-year deal with the Thunder on March 31, 2009. On December 22, 2009, Livingston was waived by the Thunder.

Washington Wizards (2010) 

On February 26, 2010, Livingston signed the first of his two 10-day contracts with the Washington Wizards. He was then signed by the Wizards for the remainder of the season.

Charlotte Bobcats (2010–2011) 
On July 20, 2010, Livingston signed a two-year contract worth $7 million with the Charlotte Bobcats.

Milwaukee Bucks (2011–2012) 
On June 23, 2011, Livingston was traded to the Milwaukee Bucks as part of a three-way deal that included the Sacramento Kings and Charlotte Bobcats.

Return to Washington (2012) 
On June 26, 2012, Livingston was traded to the Houston Rockets for Samuel Dalembert along with teammates Jon Leuer and Jon Brockman. Before the beginning of the season, however, they were all waived. On November 15, 2012, Livingston signed with the Washington Wizards. He was waived by the Wizards on December 23, 2012.

Cleveland Cavaliers (2012–2013) 
On December 25, 2012, the Cleveland Cavaliers claimed Livingston off waivers after releasing Donald Sloan. Livingston made his debut for the Cavaliers on January 2, 2013, recording two points, two rebounds, and one assist in 13 minutes of action off the bench.

Brooklyn Nets (2013–2014)
On July 11, 2013, Livingston signed with the Brooklyn Nets. His season-high of 23 points came in a 98-108 loss to the Portland Trail Blazers on November 18, 2013. Initially billed as a backup, Livingston performed well enough to join Deron Williams in the starting lineup following a season-ending injury to Brook Lopez. With Livingston on the floor, the Nets proved to be 8.5 points per 100 possessions better defensively, and he earned the third-most minutes on the team. On March 17, Livingston set a career-high for both minutes played and points scored in a season. At the end of the season Livingston had played in a career-high 76 games (beating a previous high of 61 games) and averaged 8.3 points, 3.2 assists, and 1.2 steals per game.

Golden State Warriors (2014–2019)
On July 11, 2014, Livingston signed with the Golden State Warriors for a reported three-year, $16 million contract. On August 15, 2014, he was ruled out for six to eight weeks after having arthroscopic surgery on the big toe of his right foot. He recovered in time to make his debut for the team in their season opener, and served as a key player off the bench for the Warriors in their run to the 2015 NBA Championship and soon became an integral member of the Warriors dynasty.

In 2015–16, Livingston helped the Warriors win an NBA record 73 games to eclipse the 72 wins set by the 1995–96 Chicago Bulls. During Game 4 of the 2016 Western Conference semi-finals, Livingston was ejected late in the second quarter against the Portland Trail Blazers. He had moved into the starting lineup to accommodate for the injured Stephen Curry. In the Western Conference Finals, the Warriors overcame a 3–1 deficit to defeat the Oklahoma City Thunder in seven games and advance to the 2016 NBA Finals. In Game 1 of the NBA Finals against the Cleveland Cavaliers, Livingston scored a playoff career-high 20 points, leading the Warriors to a 104–89 win. Despite the Warriors going up 3–1 in the series following a Game 4 win, they went on to lose the series in seven games to the Cleveland Cavaliers.

In 2016–17, Livingston helped the Warriors win the NBA Championship after defeating the Cavaliers 4–1 in the 2017 NBA Finals.

On July 25, 2017, Livingston re-signed with the Warriors on a three-year, $24 million contract. On December 4, he was suspended for one game without pay for an altercation with game official Courtney Kirkland during a game against the Miami Heat a day earlier. Livingston helped the Warriors win back-to-back titles in 2018 after defeating the Cavaliers in a four-game sweep in the Finals

In 2019, he played in his fifth straight NBA Finals, where the Warriors lost to the Toronto Raptors in six games. Livingston's final NBA game was Game 5 of this final series (played on June 13, 2019 with the Warriors losing to the Raptors 110 - 114) where he recorded 6 points and 1 steal in 16 minutes of playing time. On July 10, 2019, Livingston was waived by the Warriors. He went unsigned during free agency.

Retirement
On September 13, 2019, Livingston announced his retirement from the NBA. In a post, he stated: "After 15 years in the NBA, I’m excited, sad, fortunate and grateful all in one breath. Hard to put into a caption all of the emotions it takes to try and accomplish your dreams."

Post-playing career
On September 15, 2020, the Golden State Warriors announced that they had named Livingston as director of players affairs and engagement. He won his fourth NBA championship after the Warriors defeated the Boston Celtics in six games in the 2022 NBA Finals.

Personal life
Livingston is a Lutheran. In April 2016, he donated $1 million to his former grade school, Concordia Lutheran School, in Peoria, Illinois.

NBA career statistics

Regular season

|-
| style="text-align:left;"| 
| style="text-align:left;"| L.A. Clippers
| 30 || 15 || 27.1 || .414 || .000 || .746 || 3.0 || 5.0 || 1.1 || .4 || 7.4
|-
| style="text-align:left;"| 
| style="text-align:left;"| L.A. Clippers
| 61 || 14 || 25.0 || .427 || .125 || .688 || 3.0 || 4.5 || .8 || .5 || 5.8
|-
| style="text-align:left;"| 
| style="text-align:left;"| L.A. Clippers
| 54 || 31 || 29.8 || .463 || .313 || .707 || 3.4 || 5.1 || 1.1 || .5 || 9.3
|-
| style="text-align:left;"| 
| style="text-align:left;"| Miami
| 4 || 0 || 10.3 || .375 || .000 || .750 || .5 || 1.0 || .5 || .0 || 2.3
|-
| style="text-align:left;"| 
| style="text-align:left;"| Oklahoma City
| 8 || 1 || 23.8 || .538 || .000 || 1.000 || 3.3 || 2.0 || .6 || .3 || 7.8
|-
| style="text-align:left;"| 
| style="text-align:left;"| Oklahoma City
| 10 || 0 || 13.0 || .313 || .000 || .000 || 2.0 || 1.3 || .5 || .2 || 1.0
|-
| style="text-align:left;"| 
| style="text-align:left;"| Washington
| 26 || 18 || 25.6 || .535 || .000 || .875 || 2.2 || 4.5 || .5 || .3 || 9.2
|-
| style="text-align:left;"| 
| style="text-align:left;"| Charlotte
| 73 || 0 || 17.3 || .466 || .250 || .864 || 2.0 || 2.2 || .6 || .4 || 6.6
|-
| style="text-align:left;"| 
| style="text-align:left;"| Milwaukee
| 58 || 27 || 18.8 || .469 || .667 || .785 || 2.1 || 2.1 || .5 || .3 || 5.5
|-
| style="text-align:left;"| 
| style="text-align:left;"| Washington
| 17 || 4 || 18.8 || .364 || .000 || 1.000 || 2.2 || 2.2 || .6 || .1 || 3.7
|-
| style="text-align:left;"| 
| style="text-align:left;"| Cleveland
| 49 || 12 || 23.2 || .507 || .000 || .843 || 2.5 || 3.6 || .8 || .6 || 7.2
|-
| style="text-align:left;"| 
| style="text-align:left;"| Brooklyn
| 76 || 54 || 26.0 || .483 || .167 || .827 || 3.2 || 3.2 || 1.2 || .4 || 8.3
|-
| style="text-align:left;background:#afe6ba;"| †
| style="text-align:left;"| Golden State
| 78 || 2 || 18.8 || .500 || .000 || .714 || 2.2 || 3.3 || .6 || .3 || 5.9
|-
| style="text-align:left;"| 
| style="text-align:left;"| Golden State
| 78  || 3 || 19.5 || .536 || .167 || .860 || 2.2 || 3.0 || .7 || .3 || 6.3
|-
| style="text-align:left;background:#afe6ba;"|†
| style="text-align:left;"| Golden State
| 76 || 3 || 17.7 || .547 || .333 || .700 || 2.0 || 1.8 || .5 || .3 || 5.1
|-
| style="text-align:left;background:#afe6ba;"|†
| style="text-align:left;"| Golden State
| 71 || 7 || 15.9 || .501 || .000 || .820 || 1.8 || 2.0 || .5 || .3 || 5.5
|-
| style="text-align:left;"| 
| style="text-align:left;"| Golden State
| 64  || 0 || 15.1 || .519 || .000 || .784 || 1.8 || 1.8 || .5 || .4 || 4.0
|- class="sortbottom"
| style="text-align:center;" colspan=2| Career
| 833 || 191 || 20.6 || .486 || .178 || .794 || 2.4 || 3.0 || .7 || .4 || 6.3

Playoffs 

|-
| style="text-align:left;"| 2006
| style="text-align:left;"| L.A. Clippers
| 12 || 0 || 27.7 || .474 || 1.000 || .810 || 4.7 || 4.8 || .6 || .5 || 7.5
|-
| style="text-align:left;"| 2014
| style="text-align:left;"| Brooklyn
| 12 || 10 || 27.1 || .512 || 1.000 || .730 || 3.5 || 3.3 || .4 || .4 || 9.7
|-
| style="text-align:left;background:#afe6ba;"| 2015†
| style="text-align:left;"| Golden State
| 21 || 0 || 17.9 || .532 || .000 || .840 || 2.4 || 1.8 || .4 || .2 || 5.0
|-
| style="text-align:left;"| 2016
| style="text-align:left;"| Golden State
| 24 || 7 || 21.4 || .488 || .000 || .865 || 3.2 || 3.3 || .5 || .2 || 8.2
|-
| style="text-align:left;background:#afe6ba;"| 2017†
| style="text-align:left;"| Golden State
| 14 || 0 || 15.7 || .576 || .000 || .714 || 2.1 || 1.4 || .4 || .1 || 5.2
|-
| style="text-align:left;background:#afe6ba;"| 2018†
| style="text-align:left;"| Golden State
| 21 || 0 || 17.2 || .536 || .000 || .880 || 2.2 || 1.5 || .3 || .0 || 6.7
|-
| style="text-align:left;"| 2019
| style="text-align:left;"| Golden State
| 22 || 2 || 14.6 || .453 || .000 || .840 || 1.4 || 1.4 || .5 || .2 || 4.0
|- class="sortbottom"
| style="text-align:center;" colspan=2| Career
| 126 || 19 || 19.4 || .507 || .286 || .819 || 2.6 || 2.4 || .4 || .2 || 6.4

References

External links

1985 births
Living people
African-American basketball players
American Lutherans
American men's basketball players
Basketball players from Illinois
Brooklyn Nets players
Charlotte Bobcats players
Cleveland Cavaliers players
Golden State Warriors players
Los Angeles Clippers draft picks
Los Angeles Clippers players
McDonald's High School All-Americans
Miami Heat players
Milwaukee Bucks players
National Basketball Association high school draftees
Oklahoma City Thunder players
Parade High School All-Americans (boys' basketball)
Point guards
Shooting guards
Sportspeople from Peoria, Illinois
Tulsa 66ers players
Washington Wizards players